The Locals is a 2003 New Zealand horror film directed by Greg Page and starring Kate Elliott. The film took in a modest sum at the box-office following negative reviews.

Plot

The film follows two best friends Grant and Paul who hit the road for a weekend of surfing, booze and hopefully... girls. With night falling they take a short cut and meet Lisa and Kelly, a couple of babes with a fast car, who invite them to a party. Lust takes the wheel and a game of cat and mouse begins leading them deep into the heartland of evil where they meet... The Locals.

Cast
Kate Elliott – Kelly 
Dwayne Cameron – Paul
Paul Glover – Martin
John Barker – Grant
Aidee Walker – Lisa

Soundtrack 

The soundtrack to The Locals was compiled by director Greg Page and released on Festival Mushroom Records It includes tracks by eight bands Page had directed music videos for, with the remaining three artists (Inspector Moog, Rumpus Room and Mobile Stud Unit) being Hamilton bands who had inspired Page when writing the film.

References

External links 
 New Zealand Film Commission site
 
 
 "Bret Nichols Cinematography" 

2003 films
2003 horror films
New Zealand horror films
New Zealand zombie films
Supernatural slasher films
2000s English-language films